The New Kömürhan Bridge is a cable-stayed bridge that carries the Elazığ-Malatya highway D.300 over the Karakaya Dam Lake on Euphrates River in eastern Turkey. The bridge is situated between Malatya and Elazığ Provinces.

Construction began in 2014 and the new bridge was officially opened on 2 January 2021. The New Kömürhan Bridge replaced an older box-girder bridge built between 23 February 1983 and 8 April 1986 by the STFA Group.

It is ranked as the world’s 4th longest single-pylon cable-stayed bridge with its  centre span.

References 

Bridges over the Euphrates River
Cable-stayed bridges in Turkey
Buildings and structures in Malatya Province
Infobox mapframe without OSM relation ID on Wikidata